A History of the Future is the third installment in American author and social critic James Howard Kunstler's A World Made by Hand series. As Christmas Day approaches, a double murder challenges an improvised justice system, and a young man returns after a two-year journey with his own story to tell.

It is the third book in a novel series that includes The Witch of Hebron (2010) and The Harrows of Spring (2016).

References

2014 American novels
Dystopian novels
Novels set in New York (state)
Atlantic Monthly Press books